The 2020–21 Egyptian Basketball Super League was the 47th season of the Egyptian Basketball Super League. The champions qualify for the 2022 Basketball Africa League (BAL) season.
Zamalek won its 14th national title, after winning in the finals Against Al Ittihad. The season was decided in Game 5, which Zamalek won 84–80 after overtime.

Teams
6th of October and El Shams were relegated from the 2019–20 Egyptian Basketball Super League. Geziret El-Ward and Al Zohour joined the league after promoting from the second tier league. The 2020–21 season existed out of the following 16 teams:

Arenas and locations

Regular season

Top Group

Bottom Group

Playoffs
The playoffs started on 16 April 2021.

Bracket

Finals

Individual awards
The awards were announced on 28 June 2021:
Most Valuable Player: Anas Mahmoud (Zamalek)
Best Young Player: Mohab Yasser (Zamalek)
Top Scorer: Haytham Kamal (Al Ittihad)
Best Threepoint Shooter: Rami Ibrahim (Al Ittihad)

References

2020 in Egyptian sport
2021 in Egyptian sport
Egypt
Egyptian Basketball Super League